Esteban Fernando González Sánchez (born January 14, 1962) is a former Argentine footballer who played as a striker. He was a winner of the Argentine league with three different teams and he also played for the Argentina national team.

González started his professional career in 1982 with Ferro Carril Oeste, he won two Nacional championships with the club in 1982 and 1984. González was in a near fatal car crash in 1984, suffering a dislocated hip, fractured skull and multiple broken bones, putting his playing career in doubt. Despite the severity of his injuries he returned to fitness and continued his career with Ferro, he left the club in 1987 to join Deportivo Español.

In 1988, he moved to Spain to play for Málaga but returned to Argentina after only one season to join Vélez Sársfield. In his second season with Velez, he scored 18 goals to become the topscorer in the Argentine Primera. González helped Velez to win the Clausura 1993, which was their first league title in 25 years. Velez then went on to win the Copa Libertadores in 1994.

In 1994 González joined San Lorenzo de Almagro, he was part of their championship winning squad in the Clausura 1995. He then stepped down a division to play for Quilmes in the Argentine 2nd division until he retired.

Following his retirement González had a spell as assistant manager to Oscar Ruggeri at San Lorenzo, before becoming a players agent. In 2006, he took part in a Reality TV singing competition.

Titles

References

1962 births
Living people
Footballers from Buenos Aires
Argentine footballers
Argentine sportspeople of Spanish descent
Association football forwards
Argentina international footballers
Ferro Carril Oeste footballers
Deportivo Español footballers
Málaga CF players
Club Atlético Vélez Sarsfield footballers
San Lorenzo de Almagro footballers
Quilmes Atlético Club footballers
Argentine Primera División players
La Liga players
Argentine expatriate footballers
Expatriate footballers in Spain
Argentine expatriate sportspeople in Spain